Rami Tekir (born 10 January 1997) is an Austrian footballer who plays for Wacker Innsbruck.

Personal life
Born in Austria, Tekir is of Turkish descent.

References

External links

 
 

1997 births
Living people
Austrian footballers
Austrian people of Turkish descent
Association football midfielders
FC Wacker Innsbruck (2002) players
FC Liefering players
2. Liga (Austria) players
Austrian Regionalliga players
Sportspeople from Innsbruck
Footballers from Tyrol (state)